The 2013–14 Slovak 1.Liga season was the 21st season of the Slovak 1. Liga, the second level of ice hockey in Slovakia. 12 teams participated in the league, and HC 46 Bardejov won the championship.

Regular season

Playoffs

Playouts

Relegation 
 HC Topoľčany - HK Dubnica 4:3 (0:3, 3:4 SO, 2:4, 4:3 OT, 4:1, 3:2 OT, 5:1)

References
 EliteProspects.com
 EuroHockey.com

External links
 Slovak Ice Hockey Federation 

Slov
4
Slovak 1. Liga seasons